Shorkaror (also transliterated Sherkarer, Sherakerer) was a king of Kush (ca. 20–30 AD).

Shorkahor was the third son of Natakamani and Amanitore. His older brothers Arikhankharer and Arikakahtani had been crown-prince before Shorkahor.

While he was crown-prince the temple at Amada was constructed. His name was also found in the Napata Temple (room B 501). Queen Amanitore seems to have died before her husband Natakamani. After Natakamani's death Shorkahor took the throne.

Shorkahor commanded the inscription of a Meroitic relief found at Jabal Qayli, near the trade route to Kassala. This is the easternmost inscription of the Meroitic kings found so far.

According to Reisner, Shorkahor was likely buried in Pyramid 10 at Meroe (Bagrawiyah).

References

1st-century monarchs of Kush
1st-century monarchs in Africa